Vijay Bahuguna (born 28 February 1947) is an Indian politician who served as the 6th Chief Minister of Uttarakhand. He is the eldest son of Hemwati Nandan Bahuguna, an independence activist and politician, and also a former Chief Minister of Uttar Pradesh. Vijay Bahuguna was a member of the 14th and 15th Lok Sabhas of India. He represented the Tehri Garhwal constituency of Uttarakhand and is a member of the Bharatiya Janata Party.

Bahuguna was sworn in as the Chief Minister of Uttarakhand on 13 March 2012. Bahuguna resigned from his CM post on 31 January 2014.

His youngest son Saurabh Bahuguna has taken forward his legacy and has won from Sitarganj ( Udham Singh Nagar), Uttarakhand Legislative Assembly. Saurabh Bahuguna from BJP won with 50597 votes.

Family and background
Vijay Bahuguna was born at Allahabad in a Brahmin family. His father was Chief Minister of Uttar Pradesh & was a freedom fighter. H. N. Bahuguna also participated in Non-Cooperation Movement. Vijay Bahuguna has a sister Rita Bahuguna who is also a politician. Rita was a former Congress leader and former president of the Uttar Pradesh Congress Committee. She joined the BJP on 20 October 2016 and was a cabinet minister in Uttar Pradesh government. Now she is Member of parliament from Allahabad.

Education and early career
Vijay Bahuguna did his Bachelor of Arts and then LLB from the University of Allahabad in Allahabad, Uttar Pradesh. He then started working as an advocate in the Allahabad High Court in Allahabad. He later became a Judge of the Allahabad High Court, later transferring to become a judge of the Bombay High Court.

Posts held

Resignation

Vijay Bahuguna had submitted his resignation as Chief Minister of Uttarakhand on 31 January 2014. His government had received widespread criticism for handling rescue operations in the wake of floods in June, 2013. Harish Rawat was sworn as Chief Minister on 1 February 2014 in presence of Governor of Uttarakhand, Aziz Qureshi.

Other associations
Member, Executive Council, Garhwal University, Uttarakhand
President, Ranjit Pandit Shiksha Samiti; running educational colleges, Allahabad
Vice-president, Uttarakhand Pradesh Congress since 1999
Member, All India Congress Committee since 1997
Ex Judge Allahabad High Court & Bombay High Court

Elections contested

Lok Sabha

Uttarakhand Legislative Assembly

References

External links

1947 births
Living people
India MPs 2004–2009
India MPs 2009–2014
Politicians from Allahabad
University of Allahabad alumni
20th-century Indian lawyers
Uttar Pradesh politicians
Indian National Congress politicians
Bharatiya Janata Party politicians from Uttarakhand
Judges of the Allahabad High Court
Judges of the Bombay High Court
Lok Sabha members from Uttarakhand
Chief Ministers of Uttarakhand
Chief ministers from Indian National Congress
People from Tehri Garhwal district
Finance Ministers of Uttarakhand